The 14th Pan American Games were held in Santo Domingo, Dominican Republic from August 1 to August 17, 2003.

Medals

Gold

Men's 3,000m Steeplechase: Néstor Nieves

Men's Light Welterweight (– 64 kg): Patrick López

Women's Foil Individual: Mariana González

Men's Kata: Antonio Díaz
Men's Kumite (– 68 kg): Jean Carlos Peña
Men's Kumite (+ 80 kg): Mario Toro
Women's Kata: Yohana Sánchez

Women's 10 m Air Pistol: Francis Gorrin

Men's 400 m Freestyle: Ricardo Monasterio
Men's 1500 m Freestyle: Ricardo Monasterio

Women's – 67 kg: Yaneth Leal

Men's Team Competition: Venezuela men's national volleyball team

Men's – 94 kg: Julio César Luña
Men's + 105 kg: Hidelgar Morillo

Silver

Women's Sprint: Daniela Larreal 
Women's Keirin: Daniela Larreal

Men's Épée Individual: Silvio Fernández
Men's Épée Team: Silvio Fernández and Rubén Limardo
Men's Sabre Individual: Carlos Bravo
Men's Sabre Team: Carlos Bravo, Eliézer Rincones, Charles Briceño, and Juan Silva
Women's Sabre Individual: Alejandra Benítez

Men's Rings: Regulo Carmona

Men's Half-Lightweight (– 66 kg): Ludwig Ortíz
Women's Lightweight (– 57 kg): Rudymar Fleming
Women's Heavyweight (+ 78 kg): Giovanna Blanco

Men's Kumite (– 62 kg): Carlos Luces
Men's Kumite (– 74 kg): José Ignacio Pérez

Men's 4 × 100 m Freestyle: Osvaldo Quevedo, Raymond Rosal, Luis Rojas, and Octavio Alesi

Women's – 49 kg: Dalia María Contreras
Women's + 67 kg: Adriana Carmona

Men's – 69 kg: Amilcar Pernia
Women's – 63 kg: Solenny Villasmil

Bronze

Women's Recurve Team: Leydi Brito, Vanessa Chacón, and Rosanna Rosario

Men's Long Jump: Víctor Castillo

Men's Light Heavyweight (– 81 kg): Edgar Muñoz
Men's Light Flyweight (– 48 kg): José Jefferson Perez

Men's Road Individual Time Trial: Franklin Chacón
Men's Team Sprint: Alexander Cornieles, Rubén Osorio, and Jhonny Hernández
Men's Keirin: Rubén Osorio

Men's Foil Team: Enrique da Silva, Joner Pérez, Carlos Pineda, and Carlos Rodríguez
Women's Épée Individual: Endrina Álvarez

Men's Extra-Lightweight (– 60 kg): Reiver Alvarenga
Women's Extra-Lightweight (– 48 kg): Analy Rodríguez
Women's Half-Lightweight (– 52 kg): Flor Velázquez
Women's Half-Heavyweight (– 78 kg): Keivi Pinto

Men's – 62 kg: Israel José Rubio
Men's – 77 kg: Octavio Mejías
Women's – 48 kg: Remigia Arcila
Women's – 58 kg: Gretty Lugo
Women's – 75 kg: Raquel López

Results by event

Athletics

Track

Road

Field

Heptathlon

Boxing

Swimming

Men's competition

Women's competition

Triathlon

See also
 Venezuela at the 2002 Central American and Caribbean Games
 Venezuela at the 2004 Summer Olympics

Nations at the 2003 Pan American Games
P
2003